Keith Hughes (June 29, 1968 – February 8, 2014) was an American basketball player who played for two years at Syracuse University and then transferred to Rutgers University, before being drafted by the Houston Rockets, and subsequently being traded to the Cleveland Cavaliers, in the 1991 NBA Draft.

High school career

Hughes started playing basketball with Carteret High School. He was named to the New Jersey All Sophomore team 1984. In 1986, he was nominated to the McDonald's All-American Game (Top 50). He attended Five Star basketball Camp in Western Pennsylvania and was named MVP twice, and was also selected to the Nike All American 50. He was a first round draft pick for the Jersey Shore Summer Basketball League (JSBL) and led in scoring and rebounds from 1984 to 1986. Most notably, Hughes was named Player of the Year in New Jersey in 1986.

College career
Hughes college career began at Syracuse University for two seasons. In his sophomore season, Hughes came off the bench, averaging 5.4 points in a limited role. He led the team in scoring in a win over St. Bonaventure University with 19 points. Seeing very little playing time, he left the team in February 1988 and transferred to Rutgers University.

After sitting out one season due to transfer rules, Hughes went on to star for Rutgers. Ranked in their first AP Poll Top 25 appearance since 1976, he led the Scarlet Knights to an NCAA Tournament Basketball appearance in 1991, losing to Arizona State in first round, 79–76.

He would score 1,257 points in two seasons (64 games) and pull down 575 rebounds, for averages of 19.6 ppg and 9.0 rpg. He was the season single scoring leader in 1989–90 and 1990–91. He would be named to the Atlantic 10 Conference second team his junior season, and the conference first team his senior season. Hughes was named Atlantic 10 Conference Men's Basketball Player of the Year in 1991. He had a career high 40 points versus Penn State to stop the nation's longest home game winning streak with a 79–78 win.

Professional career
Hughes was drafted by the Houston Rockets in the second round (47th overall), and was traded to the Cleveland Cavaliers, in the 1991 NBA Draft. After being drafted, Hughes played in the Continental Basketball Association (CBA).  In 1991, he played for Oklahoma City, averaging 17 ppg and 9 rpg. In 1992, he played for the Albany Patroons averaging 18 ppg and 14 rpg.

Hughes began his international career in 1992 with the Argentina Club, Banco De Cordoba in Provincia, averaging 27 ppg and 10 rpg. After the team folded in 1993, he played in 2 games for Italy's Pallacanestro Viola in Reggio Calabria as a replacement player. The same year he played in Turkey for Galatasaray Medical Park for 4 games, averaging 18.2 ppg and 9.2 rpg.

In 1994, Hughes played for Le Havre in France, averaging 22.3 ppg and led the league in rebounds with 13.1 rpg. Hughes then played for Poznań in Poland in 1995, averaging 18.9 ppg and 11.2 rpg. He returned to play in France in 1996 with Saint-Brieuc, where he started for 7 games and averaged 19.4 ppg and 12.3 rpg. The same season, he played in Belgium to replace an injured player in Pepinster.  There he averaged 17.5 ppg and 9 rpg. In 1997, he signed with Estudiantes de Olavarría in Argentina and was released in November. In December, he signed with Unia Tarnów in Poland, where he averaged 20.3 ppg and 8 rpg.

The 1999–2000 season, Hughes played for Tcherno More Sodi in Varna, Bulgaria and played in the Saporta Cup. He was named Bulgarian Player of the Year. In 2000–01 he played for Ferrol CB in Spain where he averaged 16 ppg and 12.3 rpg. In the 2001–02 season he played in Koper, Slovenia where he averaged 18.1 ppg and 9.9 rpg. In the 2002–03 season, he played for BBC Nyon in Switzerland where he led the league with 16.3 ppg and 11 rpg.

In 2006, Hughes coached the Carteret High School basketball team. He was the first inductee into the Carteret Hall of Fame along with Joe Medwick.

Death

Hughes died on February 8, 2014, at the age of 45.

References

Sources
Profile  —  TheDraftReview.com
  —  Orangehoops.org
  — Eurobasket.com
 – ESPN
 Scarletknights.com

1968 births
2014 deaths
Albany Patroons players
American expatriate basketball people in Argentina
American expatriate basketball people in Belgium
American expatriate basketball people in Bulgaria
American expatriate basketball people in France
American expatriate basketball people in Italy
American expatriate basketball people in Poland
American expatriate basketball people in Slovenia
American expatriate basketball people in Spain
American expatriate basketball people in Switzerland
American expatriate basketball people in Turkey
American men's basketball players
Basketball coaches from New Jersey
Basketball players from New Jersey
Carteret High School alumni
Galatasaray S.K. (men's basketball) players
High school basketball coaches in the United States
Houston Rockets draft picks
People from Carteret, New Jersey
Power forwards (basketball)
Rutgers Scarlet Knights men's basketball players
Sportspeople from Middlesex County, New Jersey
Syracuse Orange men's basketball players